The politics of Somaliland take place within a hybrid system of governance, which, under the Somaliland constitution, combines traditional and western institutions. The constitution separates government into an executive branch, a legislative branch, and a judicial branch, each of which functions independently from the others.

History
For its first twelve years, Somaliland had no political parties but instead followed more traditional clan-based forms of political organization. Political parties were introduced during the presidential elections and it was hoped that the recent parliamentary elections would help to usher in a representative system without allowing representation to be overtly clan-based.

District elections then held determined which parties were allowed to contest the parliamentary and presidential elections, where a party was required to demonstrate at least twenty percent of the popular vote from four out of the six regions. This was designed to ensure that parties would not organize around ethnic lines. Three parties were selected to submit presidential candidates: the United Democratic Peoples’ Party (UDUB), Kulmiye, and the Party for Justice and Welfare (UCID). On April 14, 2003, 488,543 voters participated in the presidential elections, which ran more or less smoothly. The result was a slim eighty vote controversial victory for UDUB over the Kulmiye, complicated by allegations of ballot stuffing against the incumbent UDUB. Despite calls for the Kulmiye to form a rival government, the party’s leadership did not do so, instead choosing to abide by the Supreme Court ruling that declared UDUB’s victory. Despite minor demonstrations, the transition to the presidency of Dahir Riyale Kahin proceeded peacefully. They usually ordered the paying of diya, which is a payment system for any grievances, or dealt in arbitration matters.

System of government 

Somaliland has a hybrid system of governance combining traditional and western institutions. In a series of inter-clan conferences, culminating in the Borama Conference in 1993, a qabil (clan or community) system of government was constructed, which consisted of an Executive, with a President, Vice President, and legislative government; a bicameral Legislature; and an independent judiciary. The traditional Somali elderates (guurti) was incorporated into the governance structure and formed the upper house, responsible for managing internal conflicts. Government became in essence a "power-sharing coalition of Somaliland's main clans,"  with seats in the Upper and Lower houses proportionally allocated to clans according to a pre-determined formula. In 2002, after several extensions of this interim government, Somaliland finally made the transition to multi-party democracy, with district council elections contested by six parties.

Current situation
Despite setbacks in 1994 and 1996, Somaliland has managed to prosper, assisted by its trade in livestock with Saudi Arabia. According to The Economist, it is east Africa’s strongest democracy.

It faces some significant problems to its continued survival. Like other Somali governments, it lacks a consistent taxation base and receives most of its support from private actors. Corruption remains a problem, women are virtually unrepresented in government, and there are growing concerns about voting patterns based on ethnic lines.

Economic development has been heavily supported by the diaspora, although lack of international recognition prevents international aid to it as a country.

International relations 
In 2005 Somaliland joined the Unrepresented Nations and Peoples Organisation (UNPO), an international organization dedicated to the promotion of the right to self-determination. The UN still says there are some boundaries Somaliland will have to cross before it is recognized.

Wales 
On March 1, 2006, the Welsh Assembly invited Abdirahman Mohamed Abdullahi, the speaker of the Somaliland parliament to the opening of a new Assembly building. Mr. Abdullahi said that Somaliland sees his invitation "as a mark of recognition by the National Assembly for Wales that [Somaliland has] legitimacy." The Somali community in Wales numbers 8,000-10,000, most of whom come from Somaliland.

In December 2006 representatives of the Somaliland Parliament again attended the Welsh Assembly receiving a standing ovation from its members. Two months earlier the Assembly approved the establishment of an aid budget for Africa. These moves were approved by the UK Foreign Office and Department for International Development and are seen as an attempt by the UK to encourage and reward the authorities in its former colony while avoiding the issue of formal recognition.

Executive branch

|President
|Muse Bihi Abdi
|Kulmiye
|13 December 2017
|}

Legislative branch
The Parliament (Baarlamaanka) has two chambers. The House of Representatives (Golaha Wakiilada) has 82 members, elected for a five-year term. The House of Elders (Golaha Guurtida) has 82 members, representing traditional leaders.

Political parties and elections

Somaliland elects on national level a head of state (the president)  and a legislature. The president is elected by the people for a five-year term. The Constitution limits the number of legal political parties to three at a time. , the three legal political parties in the country are the Peace, Unity, and Development Party, Waddani, and For Justice and Development.

Presidential elections

Parliamentary elections

Current Cabinet

The Council of Ministers run the day-to-day operations of the country. The cabinet is nominated by the president and the president has the authority to nominate, reshuffle and also dismiss the ministers. Ministers are approved by the  House of Representatives which is the lower house of the Parliament. The cabinet is composed of ministers, deputy ministers and also state ministers. The number of ministers in Somaliland changes from time to time,  and now there is composed of the 23 Ministries, as the cabinet is reshuffled.
, the cabinet consists of:

See also
 Electoral calendar
 Electoral system
 Foreign relations of Somaliland

References

External links
African Elections Database
Constitution of Somaliland (unofficial English translation)